Chalelu Badianlu (also Romanized as Chālelū Bādīānlū; also known as Chālelū Naṣīrpūr) is a village in Quri Chay-ye Gharbi Rural District, Saraju District, Maragheh County, East Azerbaijan Province, Iran. At the 2006 census, its population was 133, in 30 families.

References 

Towns and villages in Maragheh County